Plaster Caster is a 2001 documentary film about Cynthia Plaster Caster, the groupie who became famous for making plaster casts of rock stars' penises, including her first one of Jimi Hendrix's penis.

Synopsis 
The film explores how Cynthia developed her unique pursuit, follows the ups and downs of casting sessions with a shy guitarist and an extroverted glam rocker, and goes along for the ride as Cynthia prepares for her first gallery show in New York City in 2001.

Interview subjects 
 Jello Biafra (Dead Kennedys)
 Eric Burdon (The Animals)
 Pete Shelley (The Buzzcocks)
 Jon Langford (Mekons)
 Wayne Kramer (MC5)
 Paul Barker (Ministry)
 Chris Connelly (The Revolting Cocks)
 Ian Svenonius (The Make-Up, Nation of Ulysses)
 Momus
 Camille Paglia
 Ed Paschke

External links 
 
 
 

2001 films
2001 documentary films
American documentary films
Documentary films about fandom
Films about groupies
2000s English-language films
2000s American films